Calocosmus janus is a species of beetle in the family Cerambycidae. It was described by Henry Walter Bates in 1881. It is known from Haiti, Cuba, and the Dominican Republic.

References

Calocosmus
Beetles described in 1881